Lillian Grace Woods (born 9 April 1998) is a British actress who appeared in the film Nanny McPhee and the Big Bang as Megsie Green.

Woods' other film credits include Blessed (2008), Disco (2010) and Baby (2014). She attended Ysgol Bro Ddyfi, a school in Machynlleth, and now lives in London.

Filmography

References

External links

1998 births
British child actresses
British film actresses
Living people
Actresses from London